Polytrichadelphus is a genus of mosses belonging to the family Polytrichaceae.

The species of this genus are found in Australia and America.

Species:
 Polytrichadelphus abriaquiae Jaeger, 1880 
 Polytrichadelphus archboldii E.B.Bartram, 1942

References

Polytrichaceae
Moss genera